Phillips Graduate University  was a private graduate school in Chatsworth, Los Angeles, California. It provided numerous degrees including doctoral degree in Organizational Management & Consulting and master's degrees in family therapy, art therapy, and human relations. In 1971, Clinton E. Phillips and David Jansen, who had worked in family systems theory and family therapy at the American Institute of Family Relations, founded the California Family Study Center. In 1992, they renamed the institution to Phillips Graduate Institute and in 2016 it was changed to Phillips Graduate University. The university transferred the marriage and family therapy program in 2019 to Campbellsville University which opened an off-campus instructional site, the Los Angeles Education Center, at the former location of Phillips Graduate University.

Until April 30, 2019, it was accredited by the Western Association of Schools and Colleges. It trained more than 3,000 family therapists.

Presidents at PGU have included Ed Cox (1981-1999), Lisa Porche-Burke (1999-2009), and Yolanda J. Nunn Gorman (2009-2016).

Academics
The university's focus was on master's degree and professional doctorate degrees in psychology and the field of human relations, and organizational development, as well as post-graduate credential programs and continuing education workshops for mental health practitioners interested in furthering their knowledge.

References

Universities and colleges in Los Angeles County, California
Educational institutions established in 1971
Art therapy
Private universities and colleges in California